is a passenger railway station located in the town of Shimanto, Takaoka District, Kōchi Prefecture, Japan. It is operated by JR Shikoku and has the station number "K23".

Lines

Layout
Kageno Station consists of an island platform serving two tracks. A station building, which is unstaffed, serves as a waiting room. The island platform is accessed by means of a ramp and a level crossing. There is a siding to one side of the island platform.

Adjacent stations

History
At the time it was opened, the station was operated by Japanese National Railways (JNR). With the privatization of JNR on 1 April 1987, control of the station passed to JR Shikoku.

Surrounding area
Shimanto Town Kageno Elementary School

See also
 List of railway stations in Japan

References

External links
Station timetable

Railway stations in Kōchi Prefecture
Railway stations in Japan opened in 1947
Shimanto, Kōchi (town)